Bart Bonikowski is an American sociologist. Prior to joining the faculty at New York University (NYU), Bonikowski was an Associate professor of Sociology at Harvard University.

Early life and education
Bonikowski earned his Bachelor of Arts degree in Sociology from  Queen's University and his first Master's degree from Duke University in 2005. While at Queens, he served as Vice President of Operations for the Alma Mater Society. Following Duke, he enrolled in Princeton University for his second Master's and PhD. His thesis, published in 2011, was titled Toward a Theory of Popular Nationalism: Shared Representations of the Nation-State in Modern Democracies.

Career
Upon earning his PhD, Bonikowski joined the Weatherhead Center for International Affairs at Harvard University as a faculty associate. In 2016, Bonikowski and sociologist Paul DiMaggio published a paper in the American Sociological Review titled "Varieties of American Popular Nationalism." Their research found supporting evidence that there were at least four kinds of American nationalists;  (1) the disengaged, (2) creedal or civic nationalists, (3) ardent nationalists, and (4) restrictive nationalists.

In 2020, Bonikowski announced he was leaving Harvard to accept an Associate professor position at New York University (NYU).

References

External links

Living people
Queen's University at Kingston alumni
Duke University alumni
Princeton University alumni
Harvard University faculty
American sociologists
Year of birth missing (living people)